World Cup of Indoor Skydiving is a biennial indoor skydiving competition organised by Fédération Aéronautique Internationale.

Editions

Medalists

4-Way Formation Skydiving Open

4-Way Formation Skydiving Female

4-Way Vertical Formation Skydiving

Freefly

Freestyle

Dynamic 2-Way

Dynamic 4-Way

Solo Freestyle

External links 
Results archive (up to 2018)
Results

Parachuting organizations
Parachuting